William Cook (born August 12, 1945) is an American politician. A member of the Republican Party, he served as member of the North Carolina General Assembly from 2011 to 2019.

Cook graduated from the University of Maryland in 1970 with a Bachelor of Science degree in business administration, with a concentration in economics. After graduation, he was offered an analyst position with Potomac Electric Power Company, where he worked for 34 years.

Cook was elected to the North Carolina House of Representatives for District 6 in 2010, defeating incumbent Stan White by 21 votes after a recount. He was elected to serve as North Carolina State Senator for District 1 in 2013. During his tenure in the North Carolina General Assembly, he served as the co-chairman of the following committees: Senate's Appropriations on Natural and Economic Resources Committee, Senate's Agriculture, Environment and Natural Resource, and the Agriculture and Forestry Awareness Study Commission. Additionally, he was a member on the following committees: Education/Higher Education, Finance, Judiciary II, Commerce, Program Evaluation, Joint Legislative Oversight on Agriculture and Natural and Economic Resources, Joint Legislative Oversight on Education, Regulatory and Rate Issues in Insurance and Joint Legislative Workforce Development System Reform Oversight.

In 2017, Cook announced that he would not seek reelection.

In 2018, Cook was listed as a Champion of the Family by the NC Values Coalition.

Cook and his wife of 25 years, Holly, live in Beaufort County.

References

External links

Republican Party North Carolina state senators
Living people
1945 births
University of Maryland, College Park alumni
Businesspeople from North Carolina
21st-century American politicians
Politicians from Washington, D.C.
People from Beaufort County, North Carolina